International Consolidated Airlines Group S.A., trading as International Airlines Group and usually shortened to IAG, is an Irish-Anglo-Spanish multinational airline holding company with its registered office in Madrid, Spain, and its corporate headquarters in London, England. It was formed in January 2011 after a merger agreement between British Airways and Iberia, the flag carriers of the United Kingdom and Spain respectively, when British Airways and Iberia became wholly owned subsidiaries of IAG. British Airways shareholders were given 55% of the shares in the new company.

Since its creation, IAG has expanded its portfolio of operations and brands by purchasing other airlines – BMI (2011), Vueling (2012) and Aer Lingus (2015). The Group also owns the Level brand and Avios, the IAG rewards programme.

The company is listed on the London Stock Exchange and the Madrid Stock Exchange. It is a constituent of the FTSE 100 Index and IBEX 35 Index.

History

Creation of IAG as BA/Iberia holding company
British Airways and Iberia signed a preliminary merger agreement in November 2009. In April 2010, British Airways and Iberia signed a full merger agreement, with an intended completion date of late 2010, subject to securing the necessary regulatory approvals. The merger between British Airways and Iberia was completed on 21 January 2011, and shares in the new holding company IAG began trading in London and Madrid on 24 January.

On 6 October 2011, IAG created Iberia Express, a new low-cost airline to operate short- and medium-haul routes from IAG's Madrid hub and provide transfer feed onto Iberia's longhaul network. Iberia Express began operations on 25 March 2012.

Purchase of BMI (2011)
On 4 November 2011, IAG agreed in principle to acquire British Midland International (BMI) from Lufthansa, in a deal which would increase IAG's share of slots at Heathrow airport from 45% to 54%. On 22 December 2011, IAG agreed a binding deal with Lufthansa to acquire BMI for £172.5 million. On 30 March 2012, the purchase was approved, subject to the condition that the combined group divest itself of 12 daily slots and lease two daily slots at Heathrow airport. The acquisition was completed on 20 April 2012, and the BMI fleet and routes were integrated into the British Airways schedule throughout 2012. Slaughter and May advised IAG on the BMI acquisition.

Purchase of Vueling, and creation of IAG Cargo (2012)

On 8 November 2012, IAG made a cash tender offer to buy Vueling, a Spanish low-cost airline based in Barcelona. The offer was €7 per ordinary share of Vueling, with the total cost of acquisition anticipated to be €113m. It was funded from internal IAG resources. The reported total assets of Vueling  were €805m and in the nine months to 30 September 2012 it had generated profits before tax of €59m.  An increased offer of €9.25 was accepted by the Vueling board on 9 April 2013, and received majority shareholder approval on 23 April 2013. IAG took control of Vueling on 26 April 2013.

In December 2012, IAG completed the merger of the cargo operations of British Airways, BMI and Iberia into a single business unit, IAG Cargo.

Purchase of Aer Lingus (2015)

In January 2015, IAG made a bid of €1.36 billion for Aer Lingus. This was expected to be accepted, after the rejection of two prior bids. In May 2015, the Irish government agreed to sell its stake in Aer Lingus to IAG, as did the Aer Lingus board in late January 2015. The takeover became irreversible on 18 August 2015.

Creation of LEVEL brand

In March 2017, it was announced that a new low cost longhaul airline named LEVEL was to start operating from Barcelona in June 2017.

On 29 December 2017, it was announced that IAG bought major parts of defunct Austrian leisure airline Niki including 15 Airbus A321 aircraft and traffic rights in Düsseldorf, Munich, Vienna, Zürich and Palma de Mallorca. It is planned to establish a new Austrian subsidiary of Vueling as a replacement for Niki.

Aborted Norwegian takeover, and group fleet orders
In April 2018, it was reported that IAG was considering a takeover of Norwegian, a low-budget competitor to the group, however by early 2019 IAG had fully disposed of its stake in Norwegian.

In June 2019, IAG signed a letter of intent to purchase 200 Boeing 737 MAX aircraft even though at the time of the signing the 737 MAX was still grounded worldwide following the two fatal crashes likely caused by the design of the MCAS system. Aviation analysts have questioned IAG's leadership in making such an order when the 737 MAX design is still being rectified. IAG CEO Willie Walsh, shrugged off the plane's uncertain future. "We're partnering with the Boeing brand", he said. "That's the brand that I'm doing business with. That's the brand that I’ve worked with for years. And it's a brand that I trust".

At the 2019 Paris Air Show IAG also agreed to purchase 14 Airbus A321XLR aircraft, 8 for delivery to Iberia and 6 to Aer Lingus, with options for a further 14 of the aircraft.

Investment in Air Europa
In November 2019, IAG announced that it planned to acquire Air Europa from Globalia, for €1 billion. The deal, funded by external debt, and was expected to be completed in the second half of 2020, subject to regulatory approval. On 20 January 2021, IAG announced that it had renegotiated its deal to acquire Air Europa (via Iberia) for €500 million as a result of the COVID-19 pandemic. It also negotiated to delay payment to Globalia for 6 years. Completion of the deal was expected to take place in the second half of 2021 with the acquisition subject to approval by the European Commission.

In September 2021, IAG announced that British Airways would terminate its major short- and medium-haul base operations at Gatwick Airport with immediate effect resulting in the cancellation of more than 30 routes. This came after labour negotiations regarding the handover of these operations, most of which were still suspended due to the COVID-19 pandemic, to a newly formed budget subsidiary within IAG failed. In August 2022, IAG converted a loan to Air Europa into a 20% shareholding.

On February 23, 2023, IAG announced completion of a deal to purchase the remaining 80% of Air Europa for 400 million Euros.

Corporate affairs

Overview
IAG is incorporated as a Sociedad Anónima in Spain, where the company board meetings are held, and is domiciled in Spain for tax purposes. IAG has a primary listing on the London Stock Exchange and has been a FTSE 100 constituent since 24 January 2011. It has secondary listings on the Madrid, Barcelona, Bilbao and Valencia stock exchanges, and has been a constituent of the IBEX 35 index since 1 April 2011.

In March 2015, Qatar Airways purchased a 10% stake in International Airlines Group for €1.2 billion (US$1.26 billion). By early 2020, this had increased to 25% costing a further US$600 million.

IAG's operational headquarters, which controls the management of both its British and Spanish subsidiaries, are at the Waterside building in Harmondsworth, Greater London.

Group structure
The structure of the main operating companies is:

{| class="wikitable"
! Airline
! Affiliates
! Non-IAG affiliate airline
|-
| Aer Lingus
| Aer Lingus UK
| Aer Lingus Regional
|-
| British Airways
| BA CityFlyer
| SUN-AIR (franchise)
|-
| Iberia
| Iberia Express
| Air Nostrum (franchise, trading as Iberia Regional)
|-
| Level A
| 
| 
|-
| Vueling
| 
| 
|-
! colspan="3" | Other subsidiaries
|-
| colspan="3" |
 IAG Cargo (merger between Iberia Cargo and British Airways World Cargo)
 Avios Group (operates the IAG frequent-flyer programme)
|}
A including Level France and Level Austria.

 Group business trends 
The key trends for the International Airlines Group over recent years are shown below (as at year ending December 31):

In 2012, it was reported that British Airways' profits had been wiped out by Iberia's losses, and that the Spanish airline was in a fight for its survival. By 2013, Iberia had lost a billion euros, requiring IAG CEO Willie Walsh to defend the IAG merger. After further losses, IAG's balance sheet was in deep deficit as Iberia fought low-cost competition and a recession, and Walsh admitted that British Airways should perhaps have postponed the merger, saying, "If I'd known the Spanish economy was going to deteriorate to the scale that it did, we may have delayed the decision but ultimately I believe the merger is the right thing".
From 2014 on, Iberia returned to profitability, showing Walsh's predictions had been justified.

In February 2021, IAG said that it has lost about €7 billion due to the COVID-19 pandemic in 2020, but it had €10.3 billion of liquid funds to get through the crisis.

 Senior leadership 

 Chairman: Javier Ferrán (since January 2021)
 Chief Executive: Luis Gallego (since September 2020)

 List of former chairmen 

 Antonio Vázquez Romero (2011–2021)

 List of former chief executives 

 Willie Walsh (2011–2020)

Operations
Subsidiary airlines
British Airways, Iberia, Aer Lingus, Vueling and LEVEL operate under their separate brand names.

For details of the current aircraft operated by the group, see the fleet details for each of the main operating subsidiaries - Iberia, British Airways, Aer Lingus, and Vueling. The entire company serves around 200 destinations.

Group frequent-flyer programme
IAG operates the Avios'' frequent-flyer programme, which was created from the merger of the Air Miles, BA Miles, and Iberia Plus Points schemes on 16 November 2011. Avios points are the frequent flyer currency of Aer Lingus, British Airways, Iberia, LEVEL and Qatar Airways, and can also be used for travel within the Oneworld alliance including the likes of Vueling, American, Finnair, Qatar, Qantas, etc. A restructure in 2015 meant that all of IAG's affiliated loyalty programmes which use Avios, including Avios Travel Reward Programme, British Airways Executive Club, and Iberia Plus, were transferred to Avios Group, an IAG subsidiary.

It was announced in July 2018, that Avios.com would close to British Airways Executive Club members, with all points automatically transferred to British Airways. Qatar Airways, the largest shareholder of IAG, switched to Avios as its frequent flyer currency in March 2022.

References

External links

 

 
Airline holding companies
Airlines for Europe
Airlines of Spain
Companies listed on the London Stock Exchange
Companies listed on the Madrid Stock Exchange
Dual-listed companies
European Low Fares Airline Association
Holding companies established in 2011
Holding companies of Spain
IBEX 35
Spanish companies established in 2011